The X40 is a series of electric multiple units operated by SJ of Sweden. They are in service from Stockholm to Linköping, Västerås/Örebro, Uppsala and Gävle/Sandviken, and since 2010 to Gothenburg via Västerås. The double decker trains were built by Alstom from 2004–2008, with 43 units being delivered, either in a two-car or three-car configuration. It is based on the Coradia series, very similar to the French SNCF Class Z 26500 double decker trains, and similar to the X60-series.

The X40 is the first true double-decker train to operate in Sweden, although the first and last cars of the Y3 were built in a style similar to dome cars, connected to single-deck coaches. From 2019 onwards the bilevel Stadler DOSTO will also be used in the Mälardalen and Uppsala regions of Sweden.

Among crew and technical support the vehicle early got nicknamed "Flodhäst", in English "Hippo - big, gray and unpredictable".

Specifications
The double deckers have a little higher passenger capacity than conventional cars, with 85 compared to 78 seats. Wider doors allow the trains to make only 30 second stops in smaller stations and 60 second stops in larger stations. Often the trains are paired, with one two-car and one three-car unit. The X40 has both first and second class, but with the same level of comfort. There is air conditioning, signal boosting for mobile telephones, electrical plugs at each chair, that is also equipped with radio. WLAN is available for free to all passengers.

There were many technical problems during the first year of operation in 2006, including problems with doors and the air conditioning. Complaints from passengers were that there was too little room for baggage and that the seat pitch was insufficient. These problems have been addressed through rebuilding the interior, which also included removing all vending machines and coffeemakers from the trains themselves. The trains are specified for regional commuter traffic, and some complaints come from passengers on longer journeys. For example, a common route for the train is Gävle-Stockholm-Linköping, with stop at Arlanda Airport, which means that tourists with heavy luggage use the train. During 2011 they have been used for even longer distances, like Stockholm-Örebro-Göteborg and Stockholm-Sundsvall, which has added to these complaints. In 2012 the new SJ 3000 have replaced the X40 on the Stockholm-Sundsvall line.

External links

Järnväg.net on X40 

Alstom Coradia Duplex
High-speed trains of Sweden
X40
Passenger trains running at least at 200 km/h in commercial operations
X40
Train-related introductions in 2006
15 kV AC multiple units